Ayatollah Sheikh Nimr Baqir al-Nimr (21 June 1959 – 2 January 2016), commonly referred to as Sheikh Nimr, was a Shia sheikh in al-Awamiyah in Saudi Arabia's Eastern Province whose arrest and execution was widely condemned, including by governments and human rights organizations.

He was popular among youth and critical of the Saudi Arabian government, calling for free elections in Saudi Arabia. He was arrested by Saudi authorities in 2006, at which time al-Nimr said he was beaten by the Mabahith. In 2009, he criticised Saudi authorities and suggested that if Saudi Shia rights were not respected, the Eastern Province should secede. Saudi authorities responded by arresting al-Nimr and 35 others. During the 2011–12 Saudi Arabian protests, al-Nimr called for protestors to resist police bullets using "the roar of the word" rather than violence. The Guardian described al-Nimr as having "taken the lead in [the] uprising."

On 8 July 2012 Saudi police shot al-Nimr in the leg and arrested him in what police described as an "exchange of gunfire." Saudi police fired into a crowd of thousands who protested al-Nimr's arrest, killing two men, Akbar al-Shakhouri and Mohamed al-Felfel. Al-Nimr started a hunger strike and allegedly was tortured. The Asharq Center for Human Rights expressed concern for al-Nimr's health during his hunger strike on 21 August, calling for international support to allow access by family, lawyer and human rights activists.

On 15 October 2014 al-Nimr was sentenced to death by the Specialized Criminal Court for "seeking 'foreign meddling' in Saudi Arabia, 'disobeying' its rulers and taking up arms against the security forces." His brother, Mohammad al-Nimr, was arrested on the same day for tweeting information about the death sentence. Al-Nimr was executed on or shortly before 2 January 2016, along with 46 others. His execution was condemned by Iran and Shiites throughout the Middle East, as well as by Western figures and Sunnis opposed to sectarianism. The Saudi government said the body would not be handed over to the family. In March 2017, after a long campaign of harassment, the Saudi security forces killed two cousins of Nimr family during a raid on a farm in eastern Saudi Arabia. Miqdad and Mohammad Al-Nimr were killed at a farm in Awamiyah, the Nimr family hometown.

Early life, family and education

Al-Nimr began his religious studies in al-Awamiyah, and then moved to Iran in 1980, to complete his studies. He studied in al-Qaim seminary in Tehran, under Ayatollah Ali-Akbar al-Modarresi mainly, the younger brother of Grand Ayatollah Muhammad-Taqi al-Modarresi, as well as other senior scholars.

Religious career
After al-Qaim was closed down by the Iranian government, he moved to Damascus, Syria. He initially followed Grand Ayatollah Muhammad al-Shirazi and later followed Grand Ayatollah al-Modarresi.

, he was independent of the two main political groups in the Eastern Province Shia community, Islahiyyah (the Shirazis) and Hezbollah Al-Hejaz (Saudi Hezbollah).

Al-Nimr had been the Friday prayers leader in al-Awamiyah since 2008.

Points of view 
Al-Nimr supported "something between" individual and council forms of guardianship of the Islamic Jurists as a form of government. He supported Kurdish majority control of Iraqi Kurdistan. Al-Nimr believed that Shia ayatollahs would not promote violence and "murder in the name of God". He supported "the idea of elections".

Al-Nimr criticized Bahrain's monarchy, which suppressed anti-government demonstrations in Bahrain in 2011. Al-Nimr also criticized Syria's Bashar Assad, saying "(Bahrain's ruling family) Al Khalifa are oppressors, and the Sunnis are innocent of them. They're not Sunnis, they're tyrants. The Assads in Syria are oppressors ... We do not defend oppressors and those oppressed shouldn't defend the oppressor."

In August 2008, he said that he saw US citizens as a natural ally of Shia as the thinking of both US citizens and Shia is "based on justice and liberty". He told a diplomat that he believed in these "American ideals".

He believed that the Saudi state is "particularly reactionary" and that "agitation" is needed to influence the state in general and the Saudi state in particular. According to John Kincannon, Counselor for Public Affairs at the U.S. embassy in Riyadh, Al-Nimr made statements "perceived as supporting Iran". In August 2008, he stated that he believed that Iran and other states outside of Saudi Arabia act mainly out of self-interest, not out of religious solidarity. He distanced himself from Iran.

Al-Nimr stated that in the case of internal conflict in Saudi Arabia, the Saudi Shia would have the right to ask for international intervention in analogy to requests for foreign military intervention by Kuwaitis and Saudis to the US in the 1990–91 Gulf War and people from Darfur during the War in Darfur.

Al-Nimr criticised Nayef bin Abdulaziz Al Saud, who was crown prince of Saudi Arabia, following Nayef's death in June 2012. He stated that "people must rejoice at [Nayef's] death" and that "he will be eaten by worms and will suffer the torments of Hell in his grave".

Popularity 
Al-Nimr was described by US diplomat Michael Gfoeller as "gaining popularity locally" in 2008. The Guardian described him as "[seeming] to have become the most popular Saudi Shia cleric among local youth" in October 2011. He retained his popularity in 2012, with thousands of people participated in Qatif street demonstrations in his support following his July 2012 arrest.

Early arrests and activity

2004 and 2006 arrests 
The Saudi authorities reportedly detained him for the first time in 2003, for leading public prayers in the village of Al-Awamiyah.
Al-Nimr was detained for several days in 2004.
He was arrested by Mabahith in 2006 and beaten during his detention. Residents of al-Awamiyah campaigned to support him and he was released after several days.

2009 sermon and arrest order 
In February 2009, an incident occurred in Medina involving differences in Shia and Sunni customs at the tomb of Muhammad, filming of Shia women by the religious police, protests by Shia in Medina and arrests. Six children were arrested during 4–8 March for taking part in a 27 February protest in Safwa.

Al-Nimr criticised the authorities' February actions in Medina and the Minister of Interior in particular for discrimination against Saudi Arabian Shia. In a sermon, he threatened secession, stating "Our dignity has been pawned away, and if it is not ... restored, we will call for secession. Our dignity is more precious than the unity of this land."

A warrant for his arrest was issued in response. Protests took place in al-Awamiyah starting 19 March. Four people were arrested, including al-Nimr's nephew, 'Ali Ahmad al-Faraj, aged 16, who was arrested on 22 March. The police started tracking al-Nimr in order to arrest him and tried to take his children hostage. By 1 April, a total of 35 people had been arrested and security forces installed checkpoints on roads to al-Awamiyah, but al-Nimr was not arrested during this time.

The Arabic Network for Human Rights Information said that the authorities were "persecuting Shia reformist Nimr Bakir al-Nimr for his criticism of policies of sectarian discrimination against the Shia in Saudi Arabia and for his call for reform and equality."

Protests, arrest and death sentence

2011–2012 Saudi Arabian protests 

In October 2011, during the 2011–2012 Saudi Arabian protests, al-Nimr said that young people protesting in response to the arrests of two al-Awamiyah septuagenarians were provoked by police firing at them with live ammunition. On 4 October, he called for calm, stating, "The [Saudi] authorities depend on bullets ... and killing and imprisonment. We must depend on the roar of the word, on the words of justice". He explained further, "We do not accept [the use of firearms]. This is not our practice. We will lose it. It is not in our favour. This is our approach [use of words]. We welcome those who follow such [an] attitude. Nonetheless, we cannot enforce our methodology on those who want to pursue different approaches [and] do not commit to ours. The weapon of the word is stronger than the power of bullets."

In January 2012, he criticised a list of 23 alleged protestors published by the Ministry of Interior. The Guardian described him as having "taken the lead in [the] uprising".

July 2012 arrest and hunger strike 
On 8 July 2012 al-Nimr was shot by police in the leg and arrested. According to Ministry of Interior spokesperson Mansour al-Turki, policemen tried to arrest al-Nimr and colleagues who were in a car. Saudi authorities alleged that Al-Nimr and his colleagues fired live bullets at the policemen, police shot their guns in response, and that al-Nimr and his colleagues attempted to escape and crashed into a police car. According to al-Nimr's brother Mohammed al-Nimr, Nimr al-Nimr was arrested "while driving from a farm to his house in al-Qatif".

The Saudi Press Agency stated that al-Nimr was charged with "instigating unrest". Mohammed al-Nimr said that his brother "had been wanted by the Interior Ministry for a couple of months because of his political views".

Thousands of people protested in response. Two men, Akbar al-Shakhouri and Mohamed al-Felfel, were killed in the protest. Pictures of al-Nimr "covered with what appeared to be a blood-stained white blanket" were published online by Eastern Province activists. On 16 July, activist Hamza al-Hassan stated that al-Nimr had received a brief visit by his family during which officials stated that the purpose of the visit was to request al-Nimr's family to "calm the angry protestors". According to al-Hassan "al-Nimr had been tortured, had bruises on his face and had broken teeth".

On 19 July, al-Nimr's family said that al-Nimr had started a hunger strike. Al-Nimr's family visited him again on 22 July. They stated that he had been badly tortured, with signs of torture on his head, that he was continuing his hunger strike, and that he had weakened.

Al-Nimr's wife, Muna Jabir al-Shariyavi, died in a New York City hospital while he was imprisoned. Two thousand people attended the funeral in Safwa on the evening of 30/31 August, called for al-Nimr to be unconditionally freed, for all Shia and Sunni detainees to be freed, and chanted "Down with Hamad", "Bahrain Free Free, Peninsula Shield out".

On 21 August, the Asharq Center for Human Rights expressed concern that al-Nimr was on the 45th day of his hunger strike while in prison and said that he had not been charged. The Asharq Center appealed for international support for allowing access to al-Nimr by his family, lawyer and human rights activists.

Trial 
Amnesty International stated that apart from the charge of firing at security forces on 8 July 2012, the other charges, of "disobeying the ruler", "inciting sectarian strife" and "encouraging, leading and participating in demonstrations" were based on documentary evidence of al-Nimr's sermons and interviews. Amnesty viewed these as representing the right to free speech and that al-Nimr did not incite violence in these. Amnesty stated that witnesses whose testimonies were used during the trial did not testify in court and that al-Nimr's lawyer was not given a fair possibility to defend him.

The European Saudi Society for Human Rights (ESSHR) reported details of five of al-Nimr's court appearances following the 8 July 2012 arrest. According to the ESSHR, 33 charges were laid in the first appearance, on 25 March 2013. On 29 April 2013 court appearance, the defence was unable to respond to the charges because it did not have the details of the list of charges. On 23 December 2013, al-Nimr's lawyer said that al-Nimr was unable to respond to the charges because he did not have a pen and paper. Al-Nimr's lawyer was informed one day before the fourth appearance, on 15 April 2014. The ESSHR stated that neither al-Nimr's lawyer nor his family were informed prior to the fifth court session, on 22 April 2014.

October 2014 death sentence 
On 15 October 2014, al-Nimr was sentenced to death by the Specialized Criminal Court for "seeking 'foreign meddling' in [Saudi Arabia], 'disobeying' its rulers and taking up arms against the security forces". Said Boumedouha of Amnesty International stated that the death sentence was "part of a campaign by the authorities in Saudi Arabia to crush all dissent, including those defending the rights of the Kingdom's Shi'a Muslim community."

Nimr al-Nimr's brother, Mohammad al-Nimr, tweeted information about the death sentence and was arrested on the same day.

The head of Iran's armed forces warned Saudi Arabia that it would "pay dearly" if it carried out the execution.

2015 appeal and imminent execution 
In March 2015 the Saudi Arabian appellate court upheld the death sentence against al-Nimr.

On 25 October 2015, the Supreme Religious Court of Saudi Arabia rejected al-Nimr's appeal against his death sentence. During an interview for Reuters, al-Nimr's brother claimed that the decision was a result of a hearing which occurred without the presence or notification of al-Nimr's lawyers and family. This being said, he still remained hopeful that King Salman would grant a pardon.

Reactions against death sentence 

 Reportedly, on 13 November 2014, Muslims of different nationalities including Afghan, Iranian, Indian, Pakistani, Iraqi and Lebanese gathered in an organized protest in front of the United Nations against the death sentence of Sheikh Nimr and raised their voice for the freedom of all political prisoners in Saudi Arabia.
 In March 2015 Nigerian people staged a protest in the city of Kano against the detention and death sentence of Sheikh Nimr al-Nimr, according to Tasnim News Agency.
 On 13 May 2015 Shia marjas Ja'far Sobhani, Naser Makarem Shirazi, and Hossein Noori Hamedani condemned the death sentence.
 Aware of the imminence of the execution of Sheikh Nimr in May 2015, Shia Muslims all over the world staged peaceful rallies and forwarded their petition to UNO to prevent the death sentence.  Protests intensified, and people took to the streets in Saudi Arabia, Bahrain, India and Iraq. In Iran, clerics and scholars staged a mass sit-in on 13 May in Qom and Mashhad, to show their solidarity with Sheikh Nimr and record their agitation.
 On 17 May 2015 Ahlul Bayt News Agency reported a peaceful protest rally in solidarity with Sheikh al-Nimr staged in Berlin, Germany.  Demonstrators demanded that the Saudi Government immediately release Sheikh Nimr and drop all illegal charges against the Shia Saudi cleric.  The protesters also condemned the systematic and widespread violations of human rights in Saudi Arabia.
 On 31 December 2015, a group of prominent Sunni clerics of Iran called the United Nations and other international organizations in a letter for heightened efforts to free al-Nimr.

Petitions from NGOs 
On 20 November 2015, besides two volunteers working for human rights and international religious freedom, 15 organisations from different religions and communities functioning for rule of humanity and justice collectively requested the US Secretary of State approach and press the King of Saudi Arabia to waive the sentence of death given to Sheikh Nimr, Ali al-Nimr, Dawood al-Marhoon and Abdullah al-Zaher.

The signatories of the petition were: Americans for Democracy & Human rights in Bahrain (ADHRB); Amnesty International; Bahrain Institute for Rights and Democracy; Center for Inquiry (CFI); European Center for Democracy & Human Rights (ECDHR); European Saudi Organisation for Human Rights (ESOHR); Freedom House Human Rights Foundation; Human Rights Watch; Hindu American Foundation (HAF), International Institute for Religious Freedom (IIRF); Monitor of Human Rights in Saudi Arabia (MHRSA); Muslim Public Affairs Council; PEN American Center; Project on Middle East Democracy (POMED); Shia Rights Watch (SRW); Dr. Toby Matthiesen, senior research fellow in International Relations of the Middle East at the University of Oxford; William C. Walsh, lawyer.

Execution and reaction against 

 
In October 2014, Saudi Arabia's Supreme Court approved the death sentence of Nimr for disobeying the ruler, inciting sectarian strife, and encouraging, leading and participating in demonstrations. According to sources, the main charge was criticism against Saudi officials. On 2 January 2016, Saudi Arabia's government executed 47 prisoners and declared that Nimr had been among them.

Protests were held in various countries such as Iran, Iraq, Bahrain, Lebanon, Afghanistan, Pakistan, India, United Kingdom, Turkey, Australia, and United States following the execution. People in the Qatif region of Saudi Arabia's Eastern Province have taken to the streets with protesters marching from Nimr's hometown of al-Awamiyah to Qatif, chanting: "Down with the Al Saud". Also, many religious and political figures declared their opinions and reactions about execution of Sheikh Nimr.

Personal life 
Nimr al-Nimr's nephew, Ali Mohammed Baqir al-Nimr, who participated in the 2011–12 Saudi Arabian protests, was arrested in 2012 at the age of 17, sentenced to death in 2014, and expected ratification of his sentence by King Salman, to be carried out by beheading and crucifixion. His death sentence was later commuted and he was released from prison in 2021.

Muna Jabir al-Shariyavi, Nimr al-Nimr's wife, died in a hospital in New York City when he was imprisoned.

Mohammed al-Nimr, the cleric's brother, blamed US President Barack Obama for failing to use his influence with the Saudi government to prevent his brother's execution. He said: "We asked very clearly for the American president to intervene as a friend of Saudi Arabia — and the Americans did not intervene".

In 2017, during the 2017–19 Qatif unrest, Saudi security forces killed two of his cousins.

See also 

 Israa al-Ghomgham – Eastern Province human rights activist tentatively sentenced to death in August 2018
 Human rights in Saudi Arabia
 Iran–Saudi Arabia relations

References

External links 

 Nimr al-Nimr's letter to his mother before his execution

1959 births
2016 deaths
21st-century executions by Saudi Arabia
21st-century imams
Violence against Shia Muslims in Saudi Arabia
Executed Saudi Arabian people
Iran–Saudi Arabia relations
People from Eastern Province, Saudi Arabia
People of the 2011–2012 Saudi Arabian protests
Saudi Arabian democracy activists
Saudi Arabian dissidents
Saudi Arabian human rights activists
Saudi Arabian Shia Muslims
Saudi Arabian Shia clerics
Saudi Arabian torture victims
Shia–Sunni relations
Controversies in Saudi Arabia
People executed by Saudi Arabia by decapitation